Julius L. McCoy (February 21, 1932 – April 4, 2008) was an American basketball player. He was an All-American college player at Michigan State University and went on to become the all-time leading scorer in the Eastern Basketball Association (later known as the Continental Basketball Association).

McCoy played for Farrell High School in Farrell, Pennsylvania, where he led the team to the 1952 Pennsylvania State championship. He scored 1,471 career points for Farrell, a record that still stood at the time of his death in 2008. An undersized forward in high school, he was the tallest player on the 1952 squad at just over six feet tall.

He was recruited by Michigan State to play college football by then-assistant Duffy Daugherty, and chose the Spartans because he would have the opportunity to play basketball, which he ultimately chose to pursue. Nicknamed "Hooks" for the size of his hands, McCoy played for coach Pete Newell and was an immediate impact player as a sophomore. He averaged 18.6 points per game, a mark which dipped to 16.7 the following year. In his senior season, McCoy broke out, scoring 27.3 points per game – good for second in the Big Ten Conference behind Robin Freeman of Ohio State. At the close of his senior campaign, McCoy was named a third-team All-American by both the Associated Press and United Press International and was selected first-team All-Big Ten.

After the close of his college career, McCoy was drafted by the St. Louis Hawks in the 1956 NBA draft. However, he was also drafted into the U.S. Army and served in the military, resuming his basketball career with the Williamsport Billies of the Eastern Basketball Association (EBA) in 1958. He averaged 24.3 points in the 1958–59 season and earned EBA Rookie of the Year honors. He played twelve seasons in the league, primarily for the Billies and the Sunbury Mercuries, and was the all-time leading scorer in the league's history (prior to it becoming the Continental Basketball Association in 1977) and won the league MVP award in 1966. In 1995, McCoy was named to the CBA's 50th anniversary team.

After the conclusion of his playing career, McCoy served as a teacher and head boys' coach for John Harris High School in Harrisburg, Pennsylvania from 1971 to 1983. He then worked in the Pennsylvania Bureau of Transportation until his retirement in 2004. McCoy died of complications from diabetes on April 4, 2008, at age 76.

References

External links
College stats @ sports-reference.com

1932 births
2008 deaths
All-American college men's basketball players
American men's basketball players
Basketball players from Pennsylvania
Basketball players from South Carolina
High school basketball coaches in Pennsylvania
Michigan State Spartans men's basketball players
People from Cheraw, South Carolina
People from Farrell, Pennsylvania
Shooting guards
Small forwards
St. Louis Hawks draft picks
Sunbury Mercuries players
Wilkes-Barre Barons players
Williamsport Billies (basketball) players